Joan de Beauvoir de Havilland (October 22, 1917 – December 15, 2013), known professionally as Joan Fontaine, was a British-American actress who is best known for her starring roles in Hollywood films during the "Golden Age". Fontaine appeared in more than 45 films in a career that spanned five decades. She was the younger sister of actress Olivia de Havilland. Their rivalry was well-documented in the media at the height of Fontaine's career.

She began her film career in 1935, signing a contract with RKO Pictures. Fontaine received her first major role in The Man Who Found Himself (1937) and in Gunga Din (1939). Her career prospects improved greatly after her starring role in Alfred Hitchcock's Rebecca (1940), for which she received her first of three nominations for the Academy Award for Best Actress. The following year, she won that award for her role in Hitchcock's Suspicion (1941). A third nomination came with The Constant Nymph (1943). She appeared mostly in drama films through the 1940s, including Letter from an Unknown Woman (1948), which is now considered a classic. In the next decade, after her role in Ivanhoe (1952), her film career began to decline and she moved into stage, radio and television roles. She appeared in fewer films in the 1960s, which included Voyage to the Bottom of the Sea (1961), and her final film role in The Witches (1966), also known as The Devil's Own.

She released an autobiography, No Bed of Roses, in 1978, and continued to act until 1994. Having won an Academy Award for her role in Suspicion, Fontaine is the only actress to have won an Academy Award for acting in a Hitchcock film. She and her sister remain the only siblings to have won lead-acting Academy Awards.

Early life 
Joan de Beauvoir deHavilland was born on October 22, 1917, in Tokyo City, in the then Empire of Japan to English parents. Her father, Walter de Havilland (1872–1968), was educated at the University of Cambridge and served as an English professor at the Imperial University in Tokyo before becoming a patent attorney. Her mother, Lilian Augusta Ruse de Havilland Fontaine (1886–1975), was educated at the Royal Academy of Dramatic Art in London and became a stage actress who left her career after going to Tokyo with her husband. Her mother returned to work with the stage name "Lillian Fontaine" after Joan and her elder sister Olivia de Havilland achieved prominence in the 1940s. Joan's paternal cousin was Sir Geoffrey de Havilland (1882–1965), an aircraft designer known for the de Havilland Mosquito, and founder of the aircraft company which bore his name. Her paternal grandfather, the Reverend Charles Richard deHavilland, was from a family from Guernsey, in the Channel Islands.

De Havilland's parents married in 1914 and separated in 1919 when she was two; the divorce was not finalized, however, until February 1925.

Taking a physician's advice, Lilian deHavilland moved Joanreportedly a sickly child who had developed anaemia following a combined attack of the measles and a streptococcal infectionand her sister to the United States. The family settled in Saratoga, California, and Fontaine's health improved dramatically during her teen years. She was educated at nearby Los Gatos High School and was soon taking diction lessons alongside Olivia. When she was 16 years old, Joan returned to Japan to live with her father. There she attended the Tokyo School for Foreign Children, graduating in 1935.

Career 
 

Fontaine made her stage debut in the West Coast production of Call It a Day (1935) and made her film debut in MGM's No More Ladies (1935) in which she was credited as Joan Burfield. She was leading lady to Bruce Bennett (billed as Herman Brix) in a low budget independent film, A Million to One (1937).

RKO
Fontaine signed a contract with RKO Pictures. Her first film for the studio was Quality Street (1937) starring Katharine Hepburn, in which Fontaine had a small unbilled role.

The studio considered her a rising star, and touted The Man Who Found Himself (1937) with John Beal as her first starring role, placing a special screen introduction, billed as the "new RKO screen personality" after the end credit.  Fontaine later said it had "an A budget but a Z story."

RKO put her in You Can't Beat Love (1937) with Preston Foster and Music for Madame (1937) with Nino Martini.

She next appeared in a major role alongside Fred Astaire in his first RKO film without Ginger Rogers, A Damsel in Distress (1937). Despite being directed by George Stevens, audiences were disappointed and the film flopped. She was top billed in the comedies Maid's Night Out (1938) and Blond Cheat (1938) then was Richard Dix's leading lady in Sky Giant (1938).

Edward Small borrowed her to play Louis Hayward's love interest in The Duke of West Point (1938), then Stevens used her at RKO in Gunga Din (1939) as Douglas Fairbanks Jr.'s love interest. The film was a huge hit, but Fontaine's part was relatively small.  Republic borrowed her to support Dix in Man of Conquest (1939) but her part was small. George Cukor gave her a small role in MGM's The Women (1939).

David O. Selznick and Hitchcock
Fontaine's luck changed one night at a dinner party when she found herself seated next to producer David O. Selznick. Selznick and she began discussing the Daphne du Maurier novel Rebecca, and Selznick asked her to audition for the part of the unnamed heroine. She endured a grueling six-month series of film tests along with hundreds of other actresses before securing the part sometime before her 22nd birthday.

Rebecca (1940), starring Laurence Olivier alongside Fontaine, marked the American debut of British director Alfred Hitchcock. The film was released to glowing reviews, and Fontaine was nominated for an Academy Award for Best Actress. Fontaine did not win that year (Ginger Rogers took home the award for Kitty Foyle), but she did win the following year for Best Actress in Suspicion, which co-starred Cary Grant and was also directed by Hitchcock. This was the only Academy Award-winning acting performance to have been directed by Hitchcock.

Fontaine was then one of the biggest female stars in Hollywood, although she was typecast in female melodrama. "They seemed to want to make me cry the whole Atlantic", she later said. However, historically, she had become the top female star of the 1940s.

20th Century Fox borrowed her to appear opposite Tyrone Power in This Above All (1942) then she went to Warner Brothers to star alongside Charles Boyer in The Constant Nymph. She was nominated for a third Academy Award for her performance in this film.

She also starred as the titular protagonist in the film Jane Eyre that year, which was developed by Selznick then sold to Fox.

During the war Fontaine occasionally worked as a nurse's aide.

Fontaine starred in the film Frenchman's Creek (1944). Like Rebecca, this was also based on a novel by Daphne du Maurier. Fontaine personally considered Frenchman's Creek one of her least favorites among the films she starred in.

Selznick wanted to cast her in I'll Be Seeing You (1944) but she refused, saying she was "sick of playing the sad sack." Selznick suspended her for eight months.  Eventually she went back to work in The Affairs of Susan (1945) for Hal Wallis at Paramount, her first comedy. She returned to RKO for From This Day Forward (1946).

Rampart Productions
In August 1946 Fontaine set up her own company, Rampart Productions, with her then-husband William Dozier. Her contract with Selznick ended in February 1947 and Fontaine would work exclusively for Rampart apart from one film a year for RKO.

Their first film was Ivy (1947), a thriller where she played an unsympathetic part.

Fontaine also appeared in Letter from an Unknown Woman (1948) directed by Max Ophüls, produced by John Houseman and co-starring Louis Jourdan. It was made by Rampart Productions and released through Universal. It is today considered to be a classic with one of the finest performances of her career.

At Paramount, she appeared opposite Bing Crosby in Billy Wilder's The Emperor Waltz (1948) then went to Universal for another film for Rampart, You Gotta Stay Happy (1948), a comedy with James Stewart.

In Kiss the Blood Off My Hands, (1948), with Burt Lancaster, Nathan Juran and Bernard Herzbrun, large sets were created representing the East End of London. At Paramount she did September Affair (1950) with Joseph Cotten for Wallis, Darling, How Could You! (1951) and Something to Live For (1952), a third film with George Stevens. At RKO she was a femme fatale in Born to Be Bad (1950).

MGM hired Fontaine to play the love interest in Ivanhoe (1952), a big success. She was reunited with Jourdan in Decameron Nights (1953) then went to Paramount for the low budget Flight to Tangier (1953) with Jack Palance.

Film, TV, and theatre
Fontaine made The Bigamist (1953), directed by Ida Lupino.  She began appearing on TV shows such as Four Star Playhouse, Ford Theatre, Star Stage, The 20th Century Fox Hour, The Joseph Cotten Show, and General Electric Theater.

She won good reviews for her role on Broadway in 1954 as Laura in Tea and Sympathy, playing the role originated by Deborah Kerr. She appeared opposite Anthony Perkins and toured the show for a few months.

She was Bob Hope's leading lady in Casanova's Big Night (1956) then supported Mario Lanza in Serenade (1956). She was in Fritz Lang's Beyond a Reasonable Doubt (1956) at RKO.

Fontaine had a big hit with Island in the Sun (1957) having a romance with Harry Belafonte. At MGM she appeared with Jean Simmons and Paul Newman in Until They Sail (1957) then she made A Certain Smile (1958) at Fox.

1960s
Fontaine had the female lead in the popular Voyage to the Bottom of the Sea (1961) at Fox. She had a key role in Tender Is the Night (1962) also at Fox.

Most of her 1960s work was done on television or stage. TV shows included General Electric Theater, Westinghouse Desilu Playhouse, Startime, Alcoa Presents: One Step Beyond, Checkmate, The Dick Powell Show, Kraft Television Theatre, Wagon Train, Alfred Hitchcock Presents, and The Bing Crosby Show.

In October 1964 she returned to Broadway to appear in A Severed Head.

She tried a Hammer horror film, The Witches (1966) which she also co-produced.

Her stage work included Cactus Flower and an Austrian production of The Lion in Winter.

In 1967, she appeared in Dial M for Murder in Chicago. The following year she appeared in Private Lives.

She played Forty Carats on Broadway.

Later career
In the 1970s Fontaine appeared in stage shows and toured with a poetry reading.

She returned to Hollywood for the first time in 15 years in 1975 to appear in an episode of Cannon especially written for her. She was in The Users (1978) and was nominated for an Emmy Award for the soap opera Ryan's Hope in 1980.

Fontaine published her autobiography, No Bed of Roses, in 1978. In 1982, she traveled to Berlin, Germany, and served as a jury president for the Berlin International Film Festival.

In the early 1980s, after 25 years in New York, she moved to Carmel, California. "I have no family ties anymore, so I want to work", she said. "I still host an interview show for cable in New York. I lecture all over the country. But it wasn't enough. My theory is that if you stay busy, you haven't time to grow old. Or at least you don't notice it."

She starred in Aloha Paradise, Bare Essence, and Crossings (1986). She played the lead in a TV movie, Dark Crossings (1986), replacing Loretta Young. She said, "At my time in life, I don't want to do bit parts. Also, Rosalind Russell once said, 'Always escape the mother parts.' And I've avoided them."

Fontaine's last role for television was in the 1994 TV film Good King Wenceslas, after which she retired to her estate, Villa Fontana, in Carmel Highlands, California, where she spent time in her gardens and with her dogs.

For her contribution to the motion picture industry, Fontaine has a star on the Hollywood Walk of Fame at 1645 Vine Street. She left her hand and foot prints in front of the Grauman's Chinese Theatre on 26 May 1942.

She was a practicing Episcopalian and a member of Episcopal Actors Guild.

Sibling rivalry 

Fontaine and her elder sister, Olivia de Havilland, are the only siblings to have won lead acting Academy Awards. Olivia was the first to become an actress; when Fontaine tried to follow her lead, their mother, who favored Olivia, refused to let Joan use the family name. Subsequently, Fontaine had to invent a name, taking first Joan Burfield, and later Joan Fontaine taking her stepfather's surname. Biographer Charles Higham records that the sisters had an uneasy relationship from early childhood, when Olivia would rip up the clothes Joan had to wear as hand-me-downs, forcing Joan to sew them back together. A large part of the friction between the sisters stemmed from Fontaine's belief that Olivia was their mother's favorite child.

De Havilland and Fontaine were both nominated for the Academy Award for Best Actress in 1942. Fontaine won for her role in Alfred Hitchcock's Suspicion over deHavilland's performance in Hold Back the Dawn. Higham states that Fontaine "felt guilty about winning given her lack of obsessive career drive ...". Higham has described the events of the awards ceremony, stating that as Fontaine stepped forward to collect her award, she pointedly rejected deHavilland's attempts to congratulate her and that deHavilland was both offended and embarrassed by her behaviour. Fontaine, however, tells a different story in her autobiography, explaining that she was paralyzed with surprise when she won the Academy Award, and that deHavilland insisted that she get up to accept it. "Olivia took the situation very graciously", Fontaine wrote. "I was appalled that I'd won over my sister." Several years later, however, deHavilland apparently remembered what she perceived as a slight and exacted her own revenge by brushing past Fontaine, who was waiting with her hand extended, because deHavilland took offense at a comment Fontaine had made about deHavilland's husband.

Contrary to press reports, the sisters continued their relationship after the 1940s. After Fontaine's separation from her husband in 1952, deHavilland went to her apartment in New York often, and at least once they spent Christmas together there, in 1961. They were photographed laughing together at a party for Marlene Dietrich in 1967. Fontaine also visited deHavilland in Paris in 1969.

The sisters reportedly did not completely stop speaking to each other until 1975, after their mother's funeral, to which Joan, who was out of the country, was not invited.

Both sisters largely refused to comment publicly about their relationship. In a 1978 interview, however, Fontaine said of the sibling rivalry, "I married first, won the Oscar before Olivia did, and if I die first, she'll undoubtedly be livid because I beat her to it!" The following year, in a 1979 interview, Fontaine claimed the reason her sister and she stopped speaking to each other was that deHavilland wanted their mother (who was suffering from cancer) to be treated surgically at the advanced age of 88, which Fontaine apparently did not think was a good idea. Fontaine claims that after their mother died, deHavilland did not bother to try to find where Fontaine could be reached (Fontaine was on tour in a play). Instead, deHavilland sent a telegram, which did not arrive until two weeks later at Fontaine's next stop. According to Fontaine, deHavilland did not invite her to a memorial service for their mother. DeHavilland claims she informed Fontaine, but Fontaine brushed her off, claiming she was too busy to attend. Higham records that Fontaine had an estranged relationship with her own daughters, as well, possibly because she discovered that they were secretly maintaining a relationship with deHavilland.

Personal life 
Fontaine held dual citizenship; she was British by birthright (both her parents were British) and became an American citizen in April 1943. Outside of acting, Fontaine was also noted as being a licensed pilot, an accomplished interior decorator, and a Cordon Bleu-level chef.

She was married and divorced four times. Her first marriage was to actor Brian Aherne, in 1939, at the St. John's Chapel in Del Monte, California; they divorced in April 1945.

In May 1946, she married actor/producer William Dozier in Mexico City. They had a daughter, Deborah Leslie, in 1948, and separated in 1949. Deborah is Fontaine's only biological child. The following year, Fontaine filed for divorce, charging Dozier with desertion. Their divorce was final in January 1951. The two of them had a custody battle over their child which lingered through the 1950s.

Fontaine's third marriage was to producer and writer Collier Young on November 12, 1952. They separated in May 1960, and Fontaine filed for divorce in November 1960. Their divorce was final in January 1961.

Fontaine's fourth and final marriage was to Sports Illustrated golf editor Alfred Wright, Jr, on January 23, 1964, in Elkton, Maryland; they divorced in 1969. Fontaine also had a personal relationship with Adlai Stevenson: "We had a tenderness for each other that grew into something rather serious. There was so much speculation about our marrying in the press that over lunch at his apartment in the Waldorf Towers he told me he could not marry an actress. He still had political ambitions and the 'little old ladies from Oshkosh' wouldn't approve. I told him it was just as well. My family would hardly approve of my marrying a politician".

Fontaine had an affair with actor and producer John Houseman after her marriage to Aherne. "Ours was what was known in Hollywood as a 'romance,' -- which meant that we slept together three or four nights a week, got invited to parties together, went away together for weekends and sometimes talked about getting married without really meaning it," Houseman wrote in Front and Center, his second autobiography. 

While in South America for a film festival in 1951, Fontaine met a four-year-old Peruvian girl named Martita, and informally adopted her. Fontaine met Martita while visiting Incan ruins where Martita's father worked as a caretaker. Martita's parents allowed Fontaine to become Martita's legal guardian to give the child a better life. Fontaine promised Martita's parents she would send the girl back to Peru to visit when she was 16 years old. When Martita turned 16, Fontaine bought her a round-trip ticket to Peru, but Martita refused to go and opted to run away. Fontaine and Martita became estranged following the incident. While promoting her autobiography in 1978, Fontaine addressed the issue, stating, "Until my adopted daughter goes back to see her parents, she's not welcome. I promised her parents. I do not forgive somebody who makes me break my word."

On December 15, 2013, Fontaine died in her sleep of natural causes at the age of 96 in her Carmel Highlands home. Her longtime friend Noel Beutel said, "She had been fading in recent days and died peacefully." After Fontaine's death, deHavilland released a statement saying she was "shocked and saddened" by the news.

Fontaine's Academy Award for Best Actress in Suspicion was initially to be sold at an animal rights auction; however, the Academy threatened to sue since it was not offered back to them for $1 and Fontaine's estate retained possession.

Filmography

Television credits

Broadway credits

Radio appearances

Awards and nominations

References

Notes

Bibliography

External links 

 
 
 
 Joan Fontaine at TVGuide.com
 Photographs of Joan Fontaine
 Joan Fontaine at the CinéArtistes 

1917 births
2013 deaths
20th-century American actresses
20th-century English actresses
20th-century American memoirists
20th-century English memoirists
20th-century American women writers
20th-century English women writers
21st-century English women
20th-century American Episcopalians
21st-century American women
Actresses from Tokyo
American film actresses
American memoirists
American radio actresses
American School in Japan alumni
American stage actresses
Best Actress Academy Award winners
British expatriates in Japan
De Havilland family
British emigrants to the United States
English film actresses
English radio actresses
English stage actresses
People from Monterey County, California
People from Saratoga, California
RKO Pictures contract players
Warner Bros. contract players
Writers from California
Actresses from the San Francisco Bay Area
California Democrats
British people of Guernsey descent
People with acquired American citizenship
Women aviators
American interior designers
English interior designers
American women memoirists